Rainbow Lake is a residential lake, natural, spring-fed body of water, a private community and unincorporated area within Parsippany-Troy Hills, New Jersey, United States.

The lake is used for many recreational activities, including: swimming, fishing, ice skating, and non-motor boating. The Lake has a sand beach and a floating dock, and which are used by most members of the lake, especially throughout the summer months. The Rainbow Lake Community Club (RLCC) runs a clubhouse available to all members of the lake, which provides a volleyball court, tennis court, and a playground, organizes many community activities, and hosts a bar for the adults every weekend.

Rainbow Lake is a member of an athletic organization called Hub Lakes, which includes other local communities: Lake Valhalla, Lake Arrowhead, Estling Lake, Indian Lake, Lake Intervale, Mountain Lakes, Lake Parsippany, Cedar Lake, Rock Ridge, Lake Telemark, and White Meadow Lake. Hub Lakes provides competition between the lakes in bowling, diving, golf, horseshoes, roller hockey, softball, swimming, table tennis, tennis, track & field, and volleyball.

Lakes of Morris County, New Jersey
Lakes of New Jersey
Parsippany-Troy Hills, New Jersey